List of hospitals Alaska (U.S. state), sorted by hospital name.

Hospitals 

The American Hospital Directory lists 28 hospitals in Alaska.

 Alaska Native Medical Center, Anchorage
 Alaska Regional Hospital, Anchorage
 Bartlett Regional Hospital, Juneau
 Bassett Army Community Hospital, Fort Wainwright
 Central Peninsula General Hospital, Soldotna
 Cordova Community Medical Center, Cordova
 Elmendorf AFB Hospital, Anchorage
 Fairbanks Memorial Hospital, Fairbanks
 Kanakanak Hospital, Dillingham
 PeaceHealth Ketchikan Medical Center, Ketchikan
 Maniilaq Health Center, Kotzebue
 Mat-Su Regional Medical Center, Palmer
 Mt. Edgecumbe Hospital, Sitka
 Northstar Hospital, Anchorage
 Norton Sound Regional Hospital, Nome
 Petersburg Medical Center, Petersburg
 Providence Alaska Medical Center, Anchorage
 Providence Kodiak Island Medical Center, Kodiak
 Providence Seward Medical and Care Center, Seward
 Samuel Simmonds Memorial Hospital, Utqiaġvik
 Sitka Community Hospital, Sitka
 South Peninsula Hospital, Homer
 St. Elias Specialty Hospital, Anchorage
 Wrangell Medical Center, Wrangell
 Yukon-Kuskokwim Delta Regional Hospital, Bethel

References 

 
 

Hospitals
 
Alaska